St John the Evangelist's Church is a small Gothic Revival Anglican church located in Monkstown, County Cork, Ireland. It was completed in 1832. It is dedicated to John the Evangelist. It is part of the Diocese of Cork, Cloyne, and Ross.

History 
St John the Evangelist's was built in 1832 on a site donated by Gerard and Daniel Callaghan, at a cost of IR£950.

Architecture 
Designed by William Hill, the church is built in the Early English Gothic style of architecture. The church is cruciform, and features several unusual details such as frequent gable fronts and a canted chancel.

References

Notes

Sources 

 

Architecture in Ireland
Churches in the Diocese of Cork, Cloyne and Ross
19th-century Church of Ireland church buildings
Gothic Revival church buildings in the Republic of Ireland
19th-century churches in the Republic of Ireland